Xu Zheng (fl. 200s) was an Eastern Wu official and a Daoist author of the "Three Five Historic Records" (literally: "Three Five Calendar"). The "3-5" refers to the "Three August Ones and Five Emperors" (三皇五帝).

Xu Zheng relates two different variants of the creation myth of Pangu.

References

Eastern Wu politicians
Eastern Wu historians
Chinese folklorists
Eastern Wu poets
3rd-century Chinese historians
Chinese classicists